Farris is a 20 km long fresh water moraine-dammed lake near the Norwegian coastal town Larvik. The lake would have been a salt water fjord had it not been dammed by an end moraine left by the latest ice age. Farris is drinking water reservoir for some 170,000 people. The largest island in the lake is Bjørnøya.

The mineral water brand Farris is named after the lake.

See also
List of lakes in Norway

References

Lakes of Vestfold og Telemark
Lakes of Norway
Larvik
Porsgrunn